Aqua is the Latin word for water. It is used in many words which relate to water, such as aquatic life. In English, it may also refer to:

Arts 
 Aqua (color), a greenish-blue color

Business 
 Aqua (skyscraper), an 82-story residential skyscraper in Chicago, US
 Aqua Multiespacio, a 22-story office building in Valencia, Spain
 Aqua Restaurant, an upscale seafood restaurant in San Francisco, US
 Aqua, a brand owned by Haier

Entertainment 
 Aqua (Kingdom Hearts), a fictional character from Square Enix's video game series.
 Aqua (KonoSuba), a fictional character renowned for her lack of use from the light novel series KonoSuba.
 Aqua (manga), a Japanese manga by Amano Kozue.
 Aqua (video game), a 2010 video game for Xbox LIVE.
 Team Aqua, a fictional villainous team from Pokémon Sapphire, and Pokémon Emerald and Pokémon Alpha Sapphire.

Music 
 Aqua (Angra album), 2010
 Aqua (Asia album), 1992
 Aqua (band), a Danish eurodance group
 Aqua (Edgar Froese album), 1974
 Aqua (record producer) (born 1982), American record producer and composer
 "Aqua", a song by Ryuichi Sakamoto on the 1999 album BTTB

Other uses 
 Aqua (ingredient), purified water used in cosmetics and pharmaceuticals
 Aqua, a brand of drinking water owned by Danone in Indonesia
 Aqua (satellite), a multi-national NASA scientific research satellite
 Aqua (user interface), the visual theme of Apple's macOS operating system
 Aqua America, a water and wastewater utility company in several states, US
 Project Aqua, a proposed hydroelectric scheme for the Waitaki River, New Zealand

See also
 Agua (disambiguation)
 Aquagrill, a seafood restaurant in New York City
 Aquaman, a fictional comic book superhero
 Aquamarine (disambiguation)
 Aquaculture
 Aqwa, the capital of Abkhazia